Frampton is a hamlet in the Vale of Glamorgan in South Wales. It is divided into Little Frampton and Great Frampton.

History
The settlement's name is believed to be named after Adam De Francton, an English knight who killed Llewelyn, the last Prince of Wales. The hamlet became known for its Frampton Herd of Pedigree Aberdeen Angus.

Great Frampton

The house was built around 1600, with a front added in the late 18th century. An inventory of the house was made in 1636 upon the death of Mary Jones, a widow who owned the property at the time. In the 1770s, the astronomer Nathaniel Pigott stayed at Frampton and built an observatory.

The house is of three storeys, with a front elevation containing five bays.  It was badly damaged in a fire in 1994.  It gutted the main block, but the rear wing, dated to the 17th century and altered in the mid 20th century, still remains, though in a derelict state.

References

Villages in the Vale of Glamorgan
Country houses in Wales
Houses in the Vale of Glamorgan
Grade II listed buildings in the Vale of Glamorgan
Grade II listed houses in Wales
Farms in the Vale of Glamorgan